Aurísio Saliu Fernandes Embalo Júnior (born 29 August 1998) known as Simão Júnior, is a footballer who plays for Feirense as a defender. Born in Portugal, he represents Guinea-Bissau national football team internationally.

Club career
He made his professional debut for Cova da Piedade on 1 March 2020 in the LigaPro.

International career
He made his debut for Guinea-Bissau national football team on 26 March 2021 in an AFCON 2021 qualifier against Eswatini.

References

External links

1998 births
Living people
People from Sintra
Citizens of Guinea-Bissau through descent
Bissau-Guinean footballers
Guinea-Bissau international footballers
Portuguese footballers
Portuguese sportspeople of Bissau-Guinean descent
Association football defenders
Campeonato de Portugal (league) players
Liga Portugal 2 players
C.D. Cova da Piedade players
G.D. Estoril Praia players
U.D. Vilafranquense players
C.D. Feirense players
Sportspeople from Lisbon District